Iladalen Park may refer to:

Iladalen Park (Oslo)
Iladalen Park (Trondheim)